Alfredo Moreno Echeverría (born 11 February 1982) is a Chilean politician who was elected as a member of the Chilean Constitutional Convention.

References

External links
 

Living people
1981 births
21st-century Chilean politicians
Independent Democratic Union politicians
Members of the Chilean Constitutional Convention